Charles Kramer (1916 – March 23, 1988) was an American lawyer from New York City. He was an expert in medical malpractice law.

Kramer was born in Brooklyn in 1916. He graduated from St. John's University School of Law and established the Manhattan law firm of Kramer, Dillof, Tessel, Duffy & Moore in 1949.

Kramer wrote or co-wrote four books on medical malpractice, and co-authored a monthly column in the New York Law Journal on medical malpractice. Kramer was a director of the New York State Trial Lawyers Association, a fellow of the International Academy of Trial Lawyers, and a member of the Inner Circle of Advocates. He served as president of the Laurelton Jewish Center in Queens.

Charles Kramer was an avid art collector and donated five large and highly important collections of prints to the Metropolitan Museum of Art (Picasso linocuts), the Tel Aviv Museum of Art (surrealist prints; self-portraits; Munch) and the Israel Museum (M.C. Escher).

He died on March 23, 1988, at Mount Sinai Medical Center in Manhattan, of a heart attack, at age 72. At the time of his death he lived in Whitestone, Queens. He was survived by his wife, a son, two daughters, a sister, and six grandchildren.

Notes

1916 births
1988 deaths
New York (state) lawyers
Lawyers from New York City

St. John's University School of Law alumni
20th-century American lawyers
People from Whitestone, Queens